Metacrateria pulverulella is a species of snout moth. It was described by George Hampson in 1918. It is found in Sri Lanka.

Description
The wingspan is about 18 mm. Frons with a long flattened corneous projection more or less buried in scales. In the male, the head white and brown. Thorax pale brown. Abdomen ochreous. Forewings ochreous, with broad white costal fascia irrorated (sprinkled) with fuscous, tapering to the apex, its lower edge defined by brown. A prominent dark speck found at the lower angle of cell. The veins beyond the cell, vein 1 and inner margin white irrorated with fuscous. Hindwings are whitish.

References

Moths described in 1918
Phycitinae